Honggor Sum (Mongolian Cyrillic: ,) is a sum in the Sonid Left Banner of Xilin Gol League, Inner Mongolia, China. In 2000, it had 1621 inhabitants. It is located in high desert only  from the border with Mongolia. .

Administrative divisions
Honggor is divided into the following village-level administrative divisions:
Taomuyilalete gaqa 陶木伊拉勒特嘎查
Bayan-Khongor Gaqa
Wuriniletu gaqa 乌日尼勒图嘎查
Shurichangtu gaqa 舒日昌图嘎查
Xina midurile gaqa 新阿米都日勒嘎查
Tabanhudouga district 塔班呼都嘎生活区

References

Township-level divisions of Inner Mongolia